The Celestial Plot is a book by Adolfo Bioy Casares. It is a collection of short stories and includes a work with the same name.

Contents

"La memoria de Paulina"
"De los reyes futuros"
"El ídolo"
"La trama celeste"
"El otro laberinto"
"El perjurio de la nieve"

Plot

A soldier must pilot a new plane. He suffers an accident and is injured. He is interrogated and the army does not believe he is from Argentina. They mistake him for a spy. He calls his friends and nobody recognizes him. He cannot explain the situation, but a friend of his, the author, helps him. The author discovers the truth: the soldier has travelled to a parallel universe, a little different from this one.

Argentine short story collections
1948 short story collections